Saint Gaudiosus (died c. 540) was the Bishop of Tarazona (Turiasso), Spain.

Life
The information concerning the life of this bishop is scant, and rests on comparatively late sources. On the occasion of the translation of his remains in 1573, a sketch of his life was discovered in the grave, written on parchment; apart from the Breviary lessons of the Cathedral of Tarazona, this document contains the only extant written details concerning the life of Gaudiosus.

His father, Guntha, was a military official (spatharius) at the court of the Visigothic King Theodoric the Great from 510 to 525. The education of the boy was entrusted to St. Victorianus, abbot of a monastery near Burgos (Oca), who trained him for the service of the Church.

Later (c. 530) he was appointed Bishop of Tarazona. Nothing more is known of his activities. Even the year of his death has not been exactly determined. After his death he was venerated as a saint. According to the manuscript life found in his grave he died on 29 October, but the Church of Tarazona celebrates his feast on 3 November. He was first entombed in the church of St. Martin (dedicated later to St. Victorianus), attached to the monastery where he had spent his youthful years.

In 1573 his remains were disinterred and translated to the cathedral of Tarazona.

See also 
 Gaudiosus of Naples
 Tarazona, the capital of this Aragonese comarca 
 Tarazona y el Moncayo, the Aragonese comarca 
 Roman sites in Spain category
 Tarazona Cathedral 
 Moncayo Massif Redirected from Moncayo) 
 el Moncayo (mountain range, sierra, mountain chain; and the peak, the summit). Sistema Ibérico (Iberian System)
 Mountain ranges of the Sistema Ibérico, template
 Two-thousanders of Spain category, ie. both at the Moncayo article
 Moncayo (disambiguation)

References
 cites:
 Acta SS., I, Nov., 664-65
 De la Fuente, La Santa Iglesia de Tarazona en sus Estados Antiguos y Modernos (Madrid, 1865).

Medieval Spanish saints
6th-century bishops in the Visigothic Kingdom
540 deaths
6th-century Christian saints
Bishops of Tarazona
People from Cinco Villas, Aragon
Year of birth unknown